Orthotopic procedures (from Greek orthos, straight + topos, place) are those occurring at the normal place. Examples include:
 Orthotopic liver transplantation, in which the previous liver is removed and the transplant is placed at that location in the body
 Orthotopic heart transplantation
 Orthotopic kidney transplantation.

When organs are transplanted to a different anatomical location the procedure is said to be heterotopic (e.g. heterotopic heart transplantation).

References

Medical lists
Organ transplantation